The Aermotor Windmill Company, or Aermotor Company, is an American manufacturer of wind-powered water pumps. The widespread use of their distinctive wind pumps on ranches throughout the arid plains and deserts of the United States has made their design a quintessential image of the American West.

Hundreds of this model were in use in the southeastern U.S.;  a dozen survived in the Northwestern U.S. in 1984.

History

La Verne Noyes, founder of Aermotor Windmill Company, had hired engineer Thomas O. Perry for a different job but saw the potential of the all-metal windpump developed by Perry after extensive experiments. The first Aermotor was sold in 1888, with 24 windmills in total being sold in the first year. Aermotor soon became a strong competitor among its contemporaries selling over 20,000 of its windmills by 1892. Over the next 30 years Aermotor grew and expanded, introducing accessories and variants on "the mathematical windmill."

La Verne Noyes died in 1919. He left the Aermotor Company to a tax paying trust, with 48 colleges and universities as beneficiaries.

Aermotor continued to innovate and manufacture windmills throughout World War II and helped to produce the top secret Norden bombsight.

During the latter part of the century ownership of the Aermotor Company changed hands and had its operation moved and expanded to new venues, including the country of Argentina; Broken Arrow, Oklahoma; Brentwood, Missouri; and Conway, Arkansas. By 1981, 80% of all windmills manufactured in The United States had their genesis in Conway. In 1998 Aermotor was purchased by Kees Verheul, as owner and president. It now operates from a  facility in San Angelo, Texas. In 2006, the company was purchased by a group of West Texas ranchers, and the name restored to its original from 1888..."The Aermotor Company".

Products

Aermotor also produces and helps in procurement of the pump assembly and drilling.

List of Aermotor Fire Towers and Windmills on the National Register of Historic Places
 Arab Mountain Fire Observation Station, Arab Mountain, Piercefield, New York
 Azure Mountain Fire Observation Station, Azure Mountain, Waverly, New York
 Balsam Lake Mountain Fire Observation Station, Balsam Lake Mountain, Hardenburgh, New York
 Blue Mountain Fire Observation Station, Blue Mountain, Indian Lake, New York
 Crossroads Fire Tower, Hamburg, Arkansas
 Hadley Mountain Fire Observation Station, Hadley Mountain, Hadley, New York
 Hurricane Mountain Fire Observation Station, Hurricane Mountain Summit, Keene, New York
 John Muir National Historic Site, Martinez, California
 Kane Mountain Fire Observation Station, Kane Mountain, Caroga, New York
 Lake Mountain Lookout, Lake Mountain, Lakeside, Arizona
 Loon Lake Mountain Fire Observation Station, Summit of Loon Lake Mountain, Franklin, New York
 McKenzie Windmill, TN 58, Georgetown, Tennessee
 Mount Adams Fire Observation Station, Mount Adams, Newcomb, New York
 Mount Tremper Fire Observation Station, Mount Tremper, Shandaken, New York
 Mountain Fire Lookout Tower, Forest Service Rd. 2335 (Tower Rd.) Lakewood Ranger District, Nicolet National Forest  Riverview, Wisconsin
 Mt. Beacon Fire Observation Tower, S. Beacon Mountain, Beacon, New York
 Poke-O-Moonshine Mountain Fire Observation Station, Poke-O-Moonshine Mountain, Chesterfield, New York
 PS Knoll Lookout, Apache-Sitgreaves National Forest, Maverick, Arizona
 Red Hill Fire Observation Station, Red Hill, Denning, New York
 Snowy Mountain Fire Observation Station, Snowy Mountain, Indian Lake, New York
 St. Regis Mountain Fire Observation Station, St. Regis Mountain, Santa Clara, New York
 Utsayantha Mountain Fire Observation Station, Utsayantha Mountain, Stamford, New York
 Wakely Mountain Fire Observation Station, Wakely Mountain, Lake Pleasant, New York
 Warren County Fire Tower, 4.5 mi. S of Warrenton on NC 58 S, Liberia, North Carolina

Philanthropy
In 1918 the founder of Aermotor Windmill Company, La Verne Noyes, donated nearly $2.5 million USD to establish scholarships for veterans of World War I. The largest benefactors were University of Chicago and Iowa State University in Ames, Iowa, La Verne's alma mater. These scholarships are still available today. In addition, in 1913 Mr. Noyes gave a gift to the University of Chicago for a women's building which is the current Ida Noyes Hall, named for his wife.

References

External links

 Aermotor Windmill Company official homepage
 An interview with the president and owner of Aermotor, Kees Verheul
 An interview with Kees Verheul which spotlights his company